Berlin International University of Applied Sciences (formerly known and BAU IB or BAU International Berlin – University of Applied Sciences) is a private, non-profit institution of higher education in Berlin, Germany. It was founded in 2014 as a Fachhochschule in its own right by the state of Berlin. It is registered as the 31st private university in Berlin under German law.

Berlin International is organized into five separate academic units – two faculties, preparatory school, research institute, and a library – with the campus being located in Charlottenburg. It represents an intercultural educational environment that provides students with the tools to develop their intellectual growth, experiences and creativity.

There are currently 535 students from 92 different countries in the world enrolled at Berlin International.

History 
Berlin International was founded in 2012 on the initiative of the Turkish entrepreneur Enver Yücel, the Founder and Chairman of the BAU Global Education Network, an international network of higher institutions spread all over the world. It was first established as Campus of Bahçeşehir University Istanbul and later, in 2014, became a higher education institution in its own right. In June 2014, Berlin International was granted permission by the Berlin Senate Department of Education, Youth and Science (Senatsverwaltung für Bildung, Jugend und Wissenschaft) to begin trial operation. The degree programmes began in October 2014 with its first students.

Berlin International’s campus is located in the commercial building ensemble Salzufer 6. It’s located in Charlottenburg, which is on the border with Tiergarten. The campus has new classrooms, computer labs, design studios and a room for students working in groups. All teaching facilities are equipped with whiteboards and projects, as well as sound equipment and internet access. The Event & Video Conference Hall is equipped with a video conferencing system by Cisco Systems that uses multiple cameras. The conference hall is used to connect to other campuses that are part of the BAU Global Network for shared teaching.

Organisation and administration

Governance 
Berlin International is governed by one president and one vice president. They oversee the academic programmes of the university. Their work is reviewed by the Academic Senate, the University Advisory Board, and by a representative of a non-profit management company. The Chancellor is in charge of the operational management Berlin International.

The current President is Prof. Yüksel Pögün-Zander, PhD. Prof. Dr. Peter Mantel is the current Vice President, and Turgut Tülü, MBA is the current Chancellor and General Manager.

Advisory board 
In 2014, the university (under its former name, BAU IB) established a University Advisory Board (Hochschulrat). The Advisory Board can have anywhere between 4 and 11 members who meet twice a year to advise the presidency regarding the strategy of the university. They also advise on matters such as new study programmes, research projects, and the recruitment of professors and students. The term of office is 4 years, with members serving two terms at maximum (re-appointment is allowed only once).

Academic profile

Academic units 
Berlin International has two faculties – the Faculty of Design and the Faculty of Business Administration – with a total of seven study programmes. All programmes are taught in English, and feature interdisciplinary teaching. For students who do not meet the necessary criteria for English language certification, Berlin International also has an English Preparatory School. All research activities at Berlin International are coordinated and supported by the Research Institute. The university library, Hans-Dieter Klingemann Library, is named after its president.

Faculty of Business Administration 
The Faculty of Business Administration offers study programmes in Business Administration and Data Science & Business. Berlin International also provides its students with career-oriented professional training and intercultural qualifications.
 B.A. Data Science & Business
 B.A. Business Administration | International Management & Marketing
 B.A. Business Administration | Human Ressource Management & Leadership
 (MBA)  Master of Business Administration

Faculty of Design 
The Faculty of Design offers study programmes in Graphic Design & Visual Communication, Interior Design/Interior Architecture and Architecture, that have an international, intercultural and interdisciplinary focus.
 B.A. Architecture
 B.A. Graphic Design & Visual Communication
 B.A. Interior Architecture / Interior Design
 M.A. Interior Design
 M.A. Interior Architecture / Interior Design

English Preparatory School 
All study programmes at Berlin International are taught in English. In order to apply and follow the courses effectively if accepted, students need to have a B2 level (or higher) English language certificate. If the student doesn't obtain such certificate, they can register for the English Preparatory School. The English Preparatory School has a year-long programme taught by a native speaker that prepares students to study in English in all four language skills, as well as vocabulary and grammar.

Research Institute 
The Research Institute was created to provide support to members of Berlin International in their research activities. The institute is led by both of the faculties together. Members of Berlin International who are interested to develop a new project that would be of benefit to the university, can contact the Institute for help. Rooms, equipment, books and other resources can be requested from the head of the Institute to ensure a successful funding for the project.

Hans-Dieter Klingemann Library 
The Hans-Dieter Klingemann Library contains all academic information at Berlin International. In compliance with the study programmes, the library collects the required information and makes accessible print and digital literature for its students and faculty. The library also offers LibGuides, guided tours and tutorials, that help students and staff better identify the information they need from the library. Works produced by the staff and students at Berlin International, such as theses and research papers, journal articles and book publications, are acquired by the Hans-Dieter Klingemann Library.

Admission 
Berlin International is open to students from all over the world. All applicants can apply for their degree of choice online through Berlin International’s portal. Candidates need to complete the online application and upload all necessary documents. For the programmes at the Faculty of Design it is required to submit a portfolio. The portfolio is then followed by an admissions interview.

All programmes at Berlin International are taught in English. Therefore, candidates need only proof of English proficiency, no German knowledge is required. In case the candidate’s native language is not English and they do not have a certificate, Berlin International offers a Proficiency Examination. This exam can only be taken if the candidate gets accepted and has paid the registration fee. If the candidate doesn’t pass the proficiency exam, Berlin International has a year-long programme for studying English at the English Preparatory School.

Scholarships and financial support 
Berlin International offers scholarships that consist of a twenty-five percent reduction of the tuition fee. A scholarship is granted for an academic year and covers the twelve months of a fall term and a spring term. Applications can be made by students admitted to one of the study programmes in the two weeks following the official start of the fall term. Re-application is possible. All applications are handed in to the Students Affairs Office.

The German federal government provides student loans for German students in need of financial support. Only a part of each loan has to be paid back. The situation of each student is evaluated individually, according to the general criteria.

The students at Berlin International can apply for financial support when they begin their studies. Student who have resided in Germany for a number of years, are also eligible for this support. Once the study programmes at Berlin International have started, the university also provides its own BAföG counselling to students. Applying is possible both before and after applicants have started their studies at Berlin International.

Accreditation 
As of 5 June 2015, Berlin International is accredited as a state-recognized institution of higher education in Germany by the Berlin Senate Department of Education, Youth and Science (Senatsverwaltung für Bildung, Jugend und Wissenschaft). programme accreditation for the Bachelor in Business Administration was granted by the accreditation agency ACQUIN on 29 September 2015. On 7 December 2015, three more programmes were accredited by ACQUIN – Bachelor in Communication Design, Bachelor in Interior Design, and Bachelor in Product Design. In May 2019, Berlin International was accredited by the German Council of Science and Humanities, making it the 31st private higher education institution that successfully met the requirements of Germany's most important advisory body for science policy.

See also 
 Bahçeşehir University
 Senate of Berlin
 Enver Yücel
 Charlottenburg
 Hans-Dieter Klingemann
 Berlin State Museums
 German Academic Exchange Service
 Student loans in Germany
 ACQUIN

References 


External links 
 Official website

Universities and colleges in Berlin
Private universities and colleges in Germany
Private universities and colleges in Europe
Educational institutions established in 2012
2012 establishments in Germany
Business schools in Germany
Design schools in Germany